Rockdale is an electoral district of the Legislative Assembly in the Australian state of New South Wales. Suburbs within the electoral district include Arncliffe, Banksia, Bardwell Park, Bardwell Valley, Beverley Park, Bexley, Bexley North, Brighton-Le-Sands, Dolls Point, Kogarah, Kogarah Bay, New South Wales, Kyeemagh, Monterey, Ramsgate, Ramsgate Beach, Rockdale, Sandrigham, Sans Souci, Turella and Wolli Creek.

It is represented by Steve Kamper of the Labor Party.

History
Rockdale electoral district was first created in 1927, with the breakup of the multi-member St George. In 1930, it was abolished and largely replaced by Arncliffe.

Rockdale Council sought a new electorate for Rockdale as early as 1937. In 1941, Arncliffe was abolished and replaced by a recreated Rockdale and Cook's River.

Members for Rockdale

Election results

References

Rockdale
Constituencies established in 1927
Constituencies disestablished in 1930
1927 establishments in Australia
1930 disestablishments in Australia
1941 establishments in Australia
Constituencies established in 1941